Keauna Inaba McLaughlin (born September 25, 1992) is an American former competitive pair skater. With partner Rockne Brubaker, she is the 2008 & 2009 U.S. National Champion, the 2010 Four Continents silver medalist, and the 2007 World Junior Champion.

Personal life
Keauna McLaughlin was born in Tarzana, California. She moved to Colorado Springs, Colorado to train and attended Cheyenne Mountain High School. Her name is based on a Hawaiian word for "feminine wind running through the forest".

Her mother, Lei Ina, was a senior-level pair skater and skated professionally as a show skater with Disney on Ice. Her father left the family when she was a toddler.

Career
McLaughlin began skating at the age of four. She originally competed in single skating. As a singles skater, she is the 2006 U.S. Juvenile silver medalist. She began pair skating at age 10 and focused entirely on pair skating when she teamed up with Brubaker.

With previous partner Ethan Burgess, McLaughlin won two consecutive medals at the U.S. Championships: the bronze medal at the novice level at the 2004 U.S. Championships and the pewter medal at the junior level at the 2005 U.S. Championships. Her partner was too old for the Junior Grand Prix circuit so they split and she skated on her own for a while.

When Rockne Brubaker's previous partnership ended due to a lack of height difference, his coach Dalilah Sappenfield called McLaughlin, whom she had seen competing at other events, and arranged a try-out. McLaughlin and Brubaker teamed up in May 2006. McLaughlin relocated from California to Colorado Springs.

The pair went undefeated in their first competitive season together (2006–2007). In that season, they competed on the 2006–2007 ISU Junior Grand Prix circuit and won both their events and the Junior Grand Prix Final. They went on to win the Junior title at both the 2007 U.S. Championships and the 2007 World Junior Championships. McLaughlin and Brubaker were the fourth American pair team in history to win the World Junior title. Because of the age difference between McLaughlin and Brubaker, this was their only junior-age-eligible season.

McLaughlin and Brubaker began the 2007–2008 season on the Grand Prix circuit at the 2007 Cup of China, where they won the silver medal. They won a second silver medal at the 2007 NHK Trophy. Their success at these two competitions qualified them for the 2007–2008 Grand Prix Final, but they withdrew after the short program due to an injury to Brubaker.

Later that season, they competed at the 2008 U.S. Championships and won the senior national title, becoming the first U.S. pairs team in 51 years to win consecutive junior and senior national titles. Despite winning the U.S. Championships, McLaughlin and Brubaker were not assigned to the World Championship team or the World Junior Championship team due to ISU age restrictions. McLaughlin was too young for senior ISU championships and Brubaker was too old for the World Junior Championships. McLaughlin and Brubaker's win, combined with the wins of Jessica Rose Paetsch / Jon Nuss on the junior level, and Brynn Carman / Christopher Knierim on the novice level, gave their coach Dalilah Sappenfield a sweep of national pair champions for 2008, an accomplishment which led to Sappenfield being named Coach of the Year.

McLaughlin and Brubaker began the 2008–2009 season at the 2008 Skate America, where they won the silver medal. A week later they competed at the 2008 Skate Canada International, where they won the bronze medal. At the 2009 U.S. Championships, McLaughlin and Brubaker successfully defended their national title, which resulted in them being selected to compete at the 2009 Four Continents and the 2009 Worlds. They placed 5th at Four Continents and 11th at the World Championships.

In May 2009, McLaughlin and Brubaker changed coaches to John Nicks and relocated to California.

McLaughlin and Brubaker began the 2009–2010 season at the 2009 Cup of Russia, where they won the bronze medal. They continued their season at the 2009 Skate America, where they placed 4th. As the top American pair team on the international circuit, McLaughlin and Brubaker entered the 2010 U.S. Championships as the favorites to win their third consecutive national title and secure one of the two pair skating berths on the U.S. Olympic team. Despite several days of strong practices, they delivered an uncharacteristically rough short program, including falls on a triple salchow and a freak fall on a death spiral, leaving them in 7th place. The pair was able to move up to 5th place after the long program but it was not enough to win a place on the Olympic team.

Determined to rebound from their National Championship result, McLaughlin and Brubaker competed at the 2010 Four Continents less than ten days later. There, they recorded a personal best score in the short program and ultimately won the silver medal.

On June 22, 2010, McLaughlin announced the end of her partnership with Brubaker and also announced her retirement.

Post-eligible career
In 2010, she was cast on Skating with the Stars as a skating pro. Her partner was Brandon Mychal Smith.

Programs 
(with Brubaker)

Competitive highlights

With Brubaker

With Burgess

References

External links

 
 
 
 Keauna McLaughlin at the United States Olympic Committee

American female pair skaters
1992 births
Living people
Figure skaters from Colorado Springs, Colorado
Figure skaters from Los Angeles
Four Continents Figure Skating Championships medalists
World Junior Figure Skating Championships medalists
21st-century American women
20th-century American women